Eli Joseph Matalon, OJ (January 9, 1924 – October 31, 1999) was a Jamaican businessman and politician, representing the People's National Party (PNP). He served as Mayor of Kingston from 1971 to 1973, as Minister of Education from 1973 to 1974, and as the first Minister of National Security and Justice from 1974 to 1976.

Early life and education
Matalon was born Eleyahu Joseph Matalon on January 9, 1924 in Kingston, Jamaica. He was seventh of eleven children born to Joseph Isaac Matalon, merchant, and Florizel Madge Matalon (née Henriques). Matalon was educated at Kingston College.

Military service
During World War II, Matalon served as a flying officer in the Royal Canadian Air Force. He was a bomber pilot in the 6th Group Bomber Command.

Business career
Upon his return to Jamaica after military service, Matalon set up a cocoa-processing factory in the 1950s and ran Tropicair Jalousies and West Indies Paints, subsidiaries of ICD Group Limited, a Matalon family-owned investment holding company. He subsequently rose to become coordinator for all manufacturing and the building products division of ICD Group Limited.

Political career

Matalon first stood for elected office in the Parish Council Elections of 1969. He was elected Councillor for the Kingston and St. Andrew Corporation and subsequently as Mayor of Kingston from 1971 to 1973. In February 1973, after the PNP's victory at the polls in the 1972 general election, Matalon was appointed as Senator and Minister of State in the Ministry of Education in the Michael Manley-led administration. He served in this capacity until he was elevated to the position of Minister of Education, succeeding Sir Florizel Glasspole, who has been appointed Governor General. Glasspole was the first member of Parliament for Kingston East and Port Royal constituency, and had represented the area in Parliament for 29 years. Matalon successfully contested the resulting by-election, becoming the first Jamaican of Jewish descent to be elected to the House of Representatives. In 1974, the Ministry of National Security and Justice was created to replace the former ministries of home affairs and defense. Matalon was appointed as the first holder of the newly-created cabinet portfolios. He was succeeded in his former position of Minister of Education by Sir Howard Cooke. Matalon stepped down as Minister of National Security and Justice after only two years in office due to failing health. He was succeeded as Minister of Justice by Carl Rattray and by Keble Munn as Minister of National Security.

Honors and awards
Matalon was awarded the Order of Jamaica for public service in 1975. He was appointed Ambassador-at-large for Jamaica in February 1989. Mico University College, the oldest teacher-training institution in Jamaica, named its main auditorium the Eli Matalon Gymnasium in honour of Matalon.

Personal life and death
Matalon married Hilary (née Surridge) on March 14, 1950. The couple had 3 sons and 2 daughters. In 1976, Matalon suffered a massive heart attack, which caused him to retire from public office. In later years he lived in Miami, Florida, where he died on October 31, 1999, at the age of 75.

See also
 Ministry of Justice (Jamaica)
 List of Education Ministers of Jamaica
 List of Mayors of Kingston, Jamaica

References

|-

|-

1924 births
1999 deaths
Politicians from Kingston, Jamaica
Jamaican businesspeople
Jamaican politicians
Mayors of Kingston, Jamaica
Members of the Order of Jamaica
Jamaican people of Jewish descent
People's National Party (Jamaica) politicians
Royal Canadian Air Force personnel of World War II